Melville Wallace (22 December 1887 – 1 September 1943) was a South African sports shooter. He competed in the team free rifle event at the 1924 Summer Olympics.

References

External links
 

1887 births
1943 deaths
South African male sport shooters
Olympic shooters of South Africa
Shooters at the 1924 Summer Olympics
People from Makhanda, Eastern Cape
Cape Colony people
Sportspeople from the Eastern Cape